Michael Swain (born 1933) is a Guyanese weightlifter. He competed in the men's bantamweight event at the 1956 Summer Olympics.

References

1933 births
Living people
Guyanese male weightlifters
Olympic weightlifters of British Guiana
Weightlifters at the 1956 Summer Olympics
Place of birth missing (living people)
20th-century Guyanese people